Clarence "Pete" Sims (May 24, 1891 – December 2, 1968) was a Major League Baseball pitcher who played for the St. Louis Browns in .

A single in his only at-bat left Sims with a rare MLB career batting average of 1.000.

External links
Baseball Reference.com

1891 births
1968 deaths
St. Louis Browns players
Major League Baseball pitchers
Baseball players from Ohio
Charleston Senators players
Waco Navigators players
Wichita Falls Spudders players
People from Gallia County, Ohio